The 104th Massachusetts General Court, consisting of the Massachusetts Senate and the Massachusetts House of Representatives, met in 1883 during the governorship of Benjamin Butler. George Glover Crocker served as president of the Senate and George A. Marden served as speaker of the House.

Senators

Representatives

See also
 1883 Massachusetts gubernatorial election
 48th United States Congress
 List of Massachusetts General Courts

References

Further reading
  (includes description of legislature)

External links
 
 

Political history of Massachusetts
Massachusetts legislative sessions
massachusetts
1883 in Massachusetts